Märt Kosemets (born on 25 January 1981) is a retired Estonian professional footballer, who last played in the Meistriliiga, for JK Viljandi Tulevik, whom he joined from Flora Tallinn after the 2005 season. He played the position of defender and midfielder. He is 1.80 m tall and weighs 67 kg.

International career
He has made a total of 6 appearances for the Estonia national football team. He made his international debut in 2000.

References

External links
Futsal profile

Living people
1981 births
Footballers from Tallinn
Estonian footballers
Estonia international footballers
Viljandi JK Tulevik players
FC Flora players
FC Valga players
FC Elva players
Estonian men's futsal players
Association football defenders
Association football midfielders
JK Tervis Pärnu players